The Pârâul Întors is a right tributary of the river Buhai in Romania. It flows into the Buhai near Dorohoi.

References

Rivers of Romania
Rivers of Botoșani County